The Singapore Indian Fine Arts Society (Abbreviation: SIFAS) is an organisation that teaches Indian classical arts, including Indian classical music, in Singapore.

Founding history
Founded in 1949 with a small group of dedicated music lovers from India, Malaysia and Singapore, SIFAS has now grown into an internationally recognised institution of Indian classical music and dance employing renowned music and dance exponents from India to conduct and facilitate courses ranging from classical dance, instrumental music and vocal music in both Hindustani and Carnatic music categories. It also conducts drawing and painting classes for both enthusiasts and serious students regardless of age.

Organisation
The society itself is divided into three schools of instruction, the Academy, the Performing Arts Company and the Visual Arts School. The highly skilled staff employed in the organisation not only teach but perform regularly in Singapore and abroad to keep their performing standards and passing the fresh experience to their students. Most of such concerts performed by the staff and are supported by the public. As the emphasis on the standard and quality of music is given prime importance in the method of instruction, dedicated students of SIFAS ace in performing arts locally and internationally.

The eighth-year music diploma issued by the Academy is accredited by the University of Madras as an entry qualification for its Master's in Music degree.

Management
The institution itself is a non-profit organisation, and which is run by private funding from public and is a member of the National Arts Council in Singapore. Currently at the helm of the institution is Mr Shankar Rajan who has been appointed as Principal from 2017. The faculty of twenty-two and the management committee actively review and improvise learning techniques methods as well as organising cultural activities in Singapore.

Student atmosphere

Students of all races come and study in the institution and the bulk of them are of Indian origin. Some of them, being already artistes enrol themselves in the institution to acquire advanced schooling in music and dance. Age is no barrier to learning the arts and SIFAS has not restricted anybody regardless of age as long as they sincerely put interest for the arts.

The society's philosophy is described in Sanskrit in its logo, which reads: "Kala Samskrithi Lakshanam—Art Characterises Civilisation."

References

External links
 The Singapore Indian Fine Arts Society

Art schools in Singapore
Music schools in Singapore
Singaporean music